Deh-e Habbeh (also Romanized as Deh-e Ḩabbeh; also known as Deh-e Jabbeh) is a village in Rivand Rural District, in the Central District of Nishapur County, Razavi Khorasan Province, Iran. At the 2006 census, its population was 103, in 25 families.

References 

Populated places in Nishapur County